There are at least two lakes and a reservoirs in Golden Valley County, Montana.

Lakes
Dry Lake, el. 
 McLean Lake, el.

See also
 List of lakes in Montana

Notes

Bodies of water of Golden Valley County, Montana
Golden